This is a list of awards and nominations received by American actor Mahershala Ali. His first major film release was in the 2008 David Fincher-directed romantic fantasy drama film The Curious Case of Benjamin Button. For his performance in the 2016 film as drug dealer Juan in Moonlight, Ali received universal acclaim from critics, and was nominated for a Golden Globe Award, a SAG Award, a BAFTA in a Supporting Role, and won the Academy Award and the Critics' Choice Award for Best Supporting Actor.

Major associations

Academy Awards

BAFTA Awards

Emmy Awards (Primetime)

Golden Globe Awards

Screen Actors Guild Awards

Other awards and nominations

African-American Film Critics Association

Alliance of Women Film Journalists

Apolo Awards

Austin Film Critics Association

Australian Academy of Cinema and Television Arts Awards

BET Awards

Black Reel Awards

Boston Society of Film Critics

Chicago Film Critics Association

Critics' Choice Awards

Critics' Choice Movie Awards

Critics' Choice Super Awards

Dallas–Fort Worth Film Critics Association

Detroit Film Critics Society

Film Independent Spirit Awards

Florida Film Critics Circle

Gotham Independent Film Awards

IndieWire Critics Poll Awards

London Film Critics Circle

Los Angeles Film Critics Association

Mar del Plata International Film Festival

NAACP Image Award

National Society of Film Critics

New York Film Critics Circle

New York Film Critics Online

Online Film Critics Society

Palm Springs International Film Festival

San Diego Film Critics Society

San Francisco Film Critics Circle

Satellite Awards

St. Louis Gateway Film Critics Association

Toronto Film Critics Association

Vancouver Film Critics Circle

Village Voice Film Poll Awards

Washington D.C. Area Film Critics Association Awards

References

Notes

External links
 

Lists of awards received by American actor